Ryan G. Manelick (December 14, 1972 – December 14, 2003) was an American defense contractor.

He was employed by Ultra Services of Istanbul, Turkey when he was killed in Baghdad, Iraq on December 14, 2003, his birthday, just after leaving Camp Anaconda. He was survived by three children.

On October 9, 2003 his colleague, Kirk von Ackermann disappeared. Von Ackermann's car was found empty on a road between Kirkuk and Tikrit, with his equipment and $40,000 still inside. The case was investigated by Major Procurement Fraud Unit (MPFU) at U.S. Army Criminal Investigation Command (HQCID). Ackermann was never found.

Manelick graduated from Conestoga Valley High School in 1991.

See also
Jim Kitterman

References
Obituary for Ryan G. Manelick Lancaster Online, December 18, 2003
Bay Area civilian vanishes in Iraq Colin Freeman, San Francisco Chronicle, November 11, 2003
Suspicion surrounds missing Bay Area man Colin Freeman, San Francisco Chronicle, February 13, 2005
Death of a Contractor Dan Halpern, Rolling Stone, March 8, 2007
Iraq Coalition Casualties: Contractors  Iraq Coalition Casualty Count
The Missing Man blog with links to articles on Manelick & von Ackermann

1972 births
2003 deaths
American people of the Iraq War
Conestoga Valley High School alumni